Lindau is a small town and a former municipality in the district Anhalt-Bitterfeld in Saxony-Anhalt, Germany. It is part of the Verwaltungsgemeinschaft ("collective municipality") Elbe-Ehle-Nuthe. It is situated near Zerbst on the river Nuthe in the landscape and low mountain range Fläming and Fläming Nature Park. Since 1 January 2010, it is part of the town Zerbst.

Sights 
Castle Lindau, probably built in 9th/10th century. First mentioned in 1179.

Towns in Saxony-Anhalt
Former municipalities in Saxony-Anhalt
Zerbst